The Konstantin Simonov is a Dmitriy Furmanov-class (project 302, BiFa129M) Soviet/Russian river cruise ship, cruising in the Volga – Neva basin. The ship was built by VEB Elbewerften Boizenburg/Roßlau at their shipyard in Boizenburg, East Germany, and entered service in 1984. The ship is named after Soviet writer and poet Konstantin Simonov.

Her home port is currently Nizhny Novgorod. Captain of the Konstantin Simonov (2014) is Aleksandr Kazakov.

Features
The ship has two restaurants "Neva" and "Volga", two bars, souvenir store, solarium, conference hall and sauna.

See also
 List of river cruise ships

References

External links

Konstantin Simonov – Vodohod

1984 ships
River cruise ships
Ships built in East Germany
Passenger ships of the Soviet Union
Passenger ships of Russia